Orlovka is a rural locality (a selo) and the administrative centre of Orlovsky Selsoviet, Blagoveshchensky District, Bashkortostan, Russia. The population was 102 as of 2010. There are 3 streets.

Geography 
Orlovka is located 26 km north of Blagoveshchensk (the district's administrative centre) by road. Truzhenik is the nearest rural locality.

References 

Rural localities in Blagoveshchensky District